Bill Buenar Puplampu is a Ghanaian academic, occupational psychologist and the current Vice Chancellor of the Central University.

Early life and education
Puplampu completed his secondary school education at the Presbyterian Boys' Senior High School where he obtained his GCE A-Level. He proceeded to the University of Ghana where he obtained a Bachelor's degree in Psychology in 1985. He then went on to the  Polytechnic of East London (now University of East London) in the United Kingdom where he completed the Master's degree in Occupational psychology in 1990. He completed a Ph. D. at the University of East London in Organizational Behaviour and International Human Resource Management in 1994. He studied at the Executive Institute of McGill University in Canada in 1998. He also studied Higher Education Management at the DAAD/DIES Osnabrück University in Osnabrück in Lower Saxony, Germany in 2012.

Career
Puplampu started off with a part-time teaching job at the University of East London. He later had a full-time lecturer position at the University of Westminster also in London. He returned to Ghana to work at the University of Ghana Business School where he became the head of the Department of Organisation and Human Resource Management  and later Associate Professor. He has served as an external examiner at the Makarere University in Uganda  and in South Africa at Rhodes University, University of Pretoria and North West University. He has been a visiting scholar at the Pan-African University in Nigeria. He was the Chair of the Executive MBA Programme Committee and Editor of the Business School’s Academic Journal. In 2016, he delivered his inaugural lecture at the University of Ghana on “Towards an Organisational Revolution in Africa – Calibrated Culture, Engaged Leadership and Structured Health – Musings of an Organizational Psychologist”.

In 2010, he was appointed Dean of the Central Business School. He went on to become the Pro Vice Chancellor (Academic Affairs) in 2015. In November 2017, he became the Vice Chancellor of the Central University.

Other positions held
He is a Chartered Psychologist and Associate Fellow of the British Psychological Society and a member of the Hamburg Global University Leaders' Council. He was elected to fellowship of the Ghana Academy of Arts and Sciences in 2018. Puplampu was an Independent Director on the Board of Merchant Bank, Ghana.

Research
Puplampu's research interests have focused on  employee motivation, organisational culture and corporate leadership. He was joint lead of the "six year Research Culture project looking into research culture in universities in six African countries" with Stella Nkomo.

Family
Puplampu is married to Christiana Okang. His son Vivaldo also graduated in Psychology at the University of East London while his daughter Xavia studied International Tourism Management there. Another daughter of his, Dionne also studied Psychology. Tragically, Vivaldo succumbed to multiple sclerosis.

Publications
He has published a number of articles including: 

He is also co-editor of the following books:

See also
Central University
University of Ghana Business School

References 

Year of birth missing (living people)
Living people
Presbyterian Boys' Senior High School alumni
University of Ghana alumni
Alumni of the University of East London
McGill University alumni
Academic staff of the University of Ghana
Vice-Chancellors of universities in Ghana
Academic staff of Central University, Ghana
Academics of the University of East London
Academics of the University of Westminster
Fellows of the Ghana Academy of Arts and Sciences